The 1912–13 season was Manchester City F.C.'s 22nd season of league football and 3rd consecutive season in the First Division of English football.

At the end of the previous season, manager Harry Newbould left the club following two poor bottom-half finishes. The club had no manager for the start of the season and so a committee of club officials guided the team for their first two matches. However, before their second game - a Manchester derby at Old Trafford - Ernest Mangnall had already been confirmed as taking over the managerial position at Hyde Road, and though he was still contracted to manage City's rivals for the game, when United lost by one goal to nil the press were eager to pick up on Mangnall's delight at the result. To date, Mangnall remains the only man to have ever managed at both Manchester clubs.

Team Kit

Football League First Division

Results summary

Reports

FA Cup

Squad statistics

Squad
Appearances for competitive matches only

Scorers

All

League

FA Cup

See also
Manchester City F.C. seasons

References

External links
Extensive Manchester City statistics site

Manchester City F.C. seasons
Manchester City F.C.